The Shaikh Group (TSG) is a political consultancy focused on the Middle East and North Africa (MENA) region. Its mission is to facilitate dialogue with the peoples of the region and between states in the region, as well as with key international actors. TSG aims to advance practical initiatives that promote peace, tolerance, mutual security, and shared economic prosperity. 

Founded in September 2015, The Shaikh Group (TSG) is based in Cyprus and brings together a highly qualified team with extensive government, UN, diplomatic, research and policy-related experience. With a presence in the Middle East, Europe, and the United States, we have the capacity to convene dialogues with key parties throughout the region and beyond, and a strong commitment to the principles of independence and confidentiality that are essential to these processes. 

The TSG team launched the Syria Track II Dialogue Initiative, a project aiming to promote dialogue and build consensus among key Syrian actors, helping them put forward actionable proposals for a Syrian-led future political process to end the conflict in Syria.

Syria Track II Dialogue Initiative

In order to put an end to the intractable Syrian conflict – a war that has caused more than half a million casualties, over five million refugees, and increasing threats to regional and global stability – we believe that Syrians of all creeds and backgrounds must be given the opportunity and neutral space to come together and decide the future of their country. 

Launched in 2013 with the Brookings Institution’s Doha Center, the Initiative run by The Shaikh Group’s team has consulted with hundreds of influential Syrians from a range of political, military, civil society, and economic backgrounds through a series of workshops and smaller meetings that allow these parties to build relationships, establish mutual trust, and together elaborate elements of a political solution. 

In 2015, these meetings led to the drafting of a detailed position paper outlining key steps for a Syrian-led political process, with the input and buy-in of project participants. This position paper has since been used by Syrians involved in the Initiative as a tool for building consensus around agreed principles for a political transition that involves all Syrians.

TSG's multi-track approach now seeks to develop a broader and deeper Syrian consensus on issues such as institutional and security sector reform, transitional justice, and constitutional reform.

References

Political organisations based in Cyprus
Political consulting firms